Daisy English Higher Secondary Boarding School is an English school in the eastern part of the Chitwan District, Nepal. The principal of this school is Prem Raj Rimal. 

The school has +2 level for higher study. It is very famous among the schools of eastern Chitwan. 

Introduction of science program in 10+2 Level 

It has introduced to teach science in +2 level since 2014 (2071 BS) with experienced faculties. It is one of the best and ranking schools in Chitwan as well as in Nepal. Last year it has organized the annual science fest Drishya 2072, which is an exclusively new program in Nepal.

References

External links
Alumni website

Boarding schools in Nepal
Secondary schools in Nepal